The 1968–69 Scottish League Cup final was played on 5 April 1969 at Hampden Park in Glasgow and was the final of the 23rd Scottish League Cup competition. The final was contested by Hibernian and Celtic. Celtic won a one-sided match by 6–2, with Bobby Lennox scoring a hat-trick. Bertie Auld, Jim Craig and Willie Wallace scored Celtic's other goals, while Jimmy O'Rourke and Eric Stevenson scored for Hibs.

The final was originally scheduled for 28 October 1968, but was postponed until April because a fire destroyed part of the south stand at Hampden Park.

Match details

See also
Other League Cup finals played between the same clubs:
 1972 Scottish League Cup final
 1974 Scottish League Cup final
 2021 Scottish League Cup final (December)

References 

 Sources

External links 
 Soccerbase

1969 04
League Cup Final
Scottish League Cup Final 1969 04
Scottish League Cup Final 1969 04
1960s in Glasgow
April 1969 sports events in the United Kingdom